The 2002–03 SuperBest Ligaen season was the 46th season of ice hockey in Denmark. Eight teams participated in the league, and the Herning Blue Fox won the championship.

First round

Second round

Group A

Group B

Playoffs

External links
 Season on hockeyarchives.info
 

Dan
Eliteserien (Denmark) seasons
2002 in Danish sport
2003 in Danish sport